Donald Gordon may refer to:

 Donald Gordon (Canadian businessman) (1901–1969), Bank of Canada and Canadian National Railways executive
 Donald Gordon (South African businessman) (1930–2019), South African businessman and philanthropist
 Don Gordon (actor) (1926–2017), U.S. actor
 Don Gordon (baseball) (born 1959), baseball pitcher
 Donald "Flash" Gordon (1920–2010), World War II US Navy flying ace
 Don Gordon (ice hockey) (born 1948), professional ice hockey player
 Donald Gordon (cricketer) (born 1990), English cricketer
 Donald Gordon, a main character in Roberta Williams' Phantasmagoria
 Donald Wallace Gordon (1932–2016), American gymnast and inventor